Theronia is a genus of ichneumon wasps in the family Ichneumonidae. There are at least 30 described species in Theronia. The genus has a worldwide distribution and includes species that are endoparasitoids or hyperparasitoids of Lepidoptera.

Species
These 39 species belong to the genus Theronia:

 Theronia angustatrix Seyrig, 1934 c g
 Theronia arrosor (Tosquinet, 1903) c g
 Theronia atalantae (Poda, 1761) c g b
 Theronia atralaris Gupta, 1962 c g
 Theronia badia Gupta, 1962 c g
 Theronia brachyura Gupta, 1962 c g
 Theronia brunettea Gupta, 1962 c g
 Theronia clathrata Krieger, 1899 c g
 Theronia compacta Gupta, 1962 c g
 Theronia depressa Gupta, 1962 c g
 Theronia destructor (Smith, 1863) c g
 Theronia dimidia Gupta, 1962 c g
 Theronia flava Gupta, 1962 c g
 Theronia flaviceps (Brulle, 1846) c
 Theronia flavistigma Morley, 1914 c g
 Theronia flavopuncta Gupta, 1962 c g
 Theronia fraucai Gauld, 1984 c g
 Theronia frontella Gupta, 1962 c g
 Theronia hilaris (Say, 1829) c g b
 Theronia hispida Gupta, 1962 c g
 Theronia laevigata (Tschek, 1869) c g
 Theronia lucida (Cameron, 1903) c g
 Theronia lurida Tosquinet, 1896 c
 Theronia maculosa Krieger, 1906 c g
 Theronia maskeliyae Cameron, 1905 c g
 Theronia nigrivertex Gupta, 1962 c g
 Theronia placida (Smith, 1860) c g
 Theronia pseudozebra Gupta, 1962 c g
 Theronia punctata Gupta, 1962 c g
 Theronia pygmaea Gupta, 1962 c g
 Theronia rectangulata Gupta, 1962 c g
 Theronia simillima Turner, 1919 c g
 Theronia steindachneri Krieger, 1906 c g
 Theronia trilineata (Brulle, 1846) c g
 Theronia unilineata Gupta, 1962 c g
 Theronia univittata Seyrig, 1935 c g
 Theronia viridis Gupta, 1962 c g
 Theronia wickhami Cockerell, 1919 c g
 Theronia zebra (Vollenhoven, 1879) c g

Data sources: i = ITIS, c = Catalogue of Life, g = GBIF, b = Bugguide.net

References

Further reading

External links

 

Pimplinae